The following is a list of bays in Hong Kong:

Hong Kong Island
Clockwise order from northwest:
Belcher Bay
Wan Chai
Causeway Bay
Quarry Bay
Aldrich Bay
Shau Kei Wan
Lyee Mun Bay
Chai Wan
Siu Sai Wan
Ngan Wan
Big Wave Bay
Shek O Wan
Island Bay
Tai Tam Wan
To Tei Wan
Turtle Cove
Tung Tau Wan
Stanley Bay
Chung Hom Wan
South Bay
Middle Bay
Repulse Bay
Deep Water Bay
Tai Shue Wan
Po Chong Wan
Sham Wan
Shek Pai Wan
Tin Wan
Kellett Bay
Waterfall Bay
Telegraph Bay
Sandy Bay

Kowloon and New Kowloon
From west to east:
Lai Chi Kok Bay
Cheung Sha Wan
Hung Hom Bay
To Kwa Wan
Ngau Tsz Wan
Kowloon Bay
Kwun Tong Tsai Wan
Tsau Wan
Sohai Bay

New Territories (excluding New Kowloon)

Tuen Mun and Yuen Long
Castle Peak Bay
Deep Bay

Tsuen Wan and Kwai Tsing
Tsuen Wan
Gin Drinkers Bay
Nam Wan
Tai Nam Wan
Sai Tso Wan, Tsing Yi
Wok Tai Wan

Northern and Tai Po
Mirs Bay
Hoi Ha Wan
Plover Cove

Sha Tin and Sai Kung
Clear Water Bay
Joss House Bay
Junk Bay
Long Ke Wan
Pak Lap Wan
Pak Sha Wan
Po Toi O
Silverstrand Beach
Sha Tin Hoi
Yau Yue Wan

Lantau Island
Tung Chung Bay
Tai Ho Wan
Siu Ho Wan
Penny's Bay
Discovery Bay
Nim Shue Wan
Silvermine Bay
Chi Ma Wan
Pui O Wan
To Kau Wan

See also

 Geography of Hong Kong
 List of places in Hong Kong

External links
Harbours, channels and bays in Hong Kong

 
Hong Kong
Bays
Pacific Ocean-related lists